Thomas Edmund Molloy (September 4, 1884 – November 26, 1956) was an American prelate of the Roman Catholic Church. He served as Bishop of Brooklyn from 1921 until his death in 1956.

Biography
He was born in Nashua, New Hampshire, the fourth of the eight children of John and Ellen Molloy. He attended Saint Anselm College in Goffstown, New Hampshire, before entering St. Francis College in Brooklyn, New York and graduating in 1904. He then decided to study for the priesthood and was enrolled at St. John's Seminary in Brooklyn. He was later sent to further his studies in Rome at the Pontifical North American College and the Propaganda University.

Molloy was ordained a priest by Cardinal Pietro Respighi on September 19, 1908. Upon his return to the United States in 1909, Molloy became a curate at Queen of All Saints Church in Brooklyn. He was later named private secretary to Bishop George Mundelein, accompanying the latter to Illinois following his promotion to Archbishop of Chicago. After several months in Chicago, he returned to Brooklyn and joined the faculty of St. Joseph's College for Women, serving as spiritual director and professor of philosophy and later president.

On June 28, 1920, Molloy was appointed Auxiliary Bishop of Brooklyn and Titular Bishop of Lorea by Pope Benedict XV. He received his episcopal consecration on the following October 3 from Bishop Charles Edward McDonnell, with Bishops Edmund Gibbons and Thomas Joseph Walsh serving as co-consecrators. At age 35, he was one of the youngest members of the American hierarchy. Following the death of Bishop McDonnell in August 1921, Molloy was named the third Bishop of Brooklyn on November 21, 1921. He was installed on February 15, 1922. During his 35-year-long tenure, the number of Catholics exceeded one million and made the Brooklyn diocese the most populous in the country. He founded Immaculate Conception Seminary in 1930. During the Great Depression, he established a labor school where working men could learn the Catholic principles that apply to trade unionism. He also ordered the diocesan clergy to take courses in industrial issues to better instruct their parishioners. While Bishop of Brooklyn, Molloy was a prominent supporter of the far right, pro-Nazi Christian Front.  His diocesan newspaper, the Tablet, once addressed the charge that the Christian Front was antisemitic: "Well what of it? Just what law was violated?"[5]He was given the personal title of Archbishop on April 7, 1951.

Death and legacy
Molloy suffered a stroke and an attack of pneumonia on November 15, 1956. He died eleven days later at his residence in Brooklyn, aged 72.

Molloy was originally interred at the Seminary of the Immaculate Conception in Huntington, NY until 2016, when he was re-interred at the Cathedral College of the Immaculate Conception in Douglaston, NY.

Archbishop Molloy High School in Queens is named after him.

In 1956, the year of his death, Molloy Catholic College for Women was established in Rockville Centre. The Sisters of St Dominic (Order of Preachers) of Amityville initiated the school and teach there. The College is now co-educational and simply named Molloy College.

References

1885 births
1956 deaths
20th-century Roman Catholic bishops in the United States
People from Nashua, New Hampshire
Saint Anselm College alumni
St. Francis College alumni
Roman Catholic bishops of Brooklyn
Religious leaders from New York (state)
Catholics from New Hampshire
American Roman Catholic clergy of Irish descent